Zhou Tonghui (November 8, 1924 – February 23, 2020) was a Chinese analytical chemist and academician of the Chinese Academy of Sciences (CAS).

Biography
Zhou was born in Beijing, on November 8, 1924, while his ancestral home was in Guilin, Guangxi. He attended Pingmin Primary School Affiliated Beiping Normal University. In 1944 he graduated from Peking University. After graduation, he taught at the university. In 1948, he went to the United States to study at the University of Washington, where he earned his Master of Science degree and Doctor of Philosophy degree under the supervision of Robinson. From 1952 to 1953 he was an assistant professor at the Department of chemistry, University of Kansas. In the summer of 1953, he joined the Burroughs Wekkcomeco as a researcher. 

In 1954, Zhou and other students jointly wrote letters to the then President of the United States Dwight D. Eisenhower and the then Secretary-General of the United Nations Dag Hammarskjöld, requesting to return to China. In 1955, he and other students jointly wrote to Premier Zhou Enlai, who was then meeting in Geneva, asking the Chinese government to come forward and negotiate with the U.S. government. Finally, the U.S. government agreed to let Chinese students leave the United States on the condition of returning American prisoners of the Korean War. In June 1955, he left the United States by boat and returned to Beijing in July. In September of the same year, he was assigned to the Department of Pharmacology of National Health Research Institute (now Chinese Academy of Medical Sciences) as an associate researcher. He joined the Communist Party of China in 1986. 

Honours and awards
 1991 State Science and Technology Progress Award (First Class)
 1991 Member of the Chinese Academy of Sciences (CAS)

References

1924 births
2020 deaths
Engineers from Beijing
Peking University alumni
University of Washington alumni
Chemists from Beijing
Members of the Chinese Academy of Sciences
People of the Republic of China
Chinese expatriates in the United States